Arthur Sydney Hamilton "Ash" Cutler (17 January 1913 – 27 August 1997) was a New Zealand cricketer. He played seven first-class matches for Otago between 1938 and 1947. Later he was a first-class umpire.

Life and career
A middle-order batsman, Cutler played for Manawatu in the Hawke Cup from 1929 to 1937. He scored a century when Manawatu beat Taranaki to regain the title in December 1934; no other batsman on either side reached 50. He left Palmerston North in February 1937 to take up a position as teacher in charge of a school in the Southland Region.

Cutler married Flora Browne in Invercargill in December 1940. He served overseas in the New Zealand Infantry Brigade during World War II as a second lieutenant.

Cutler's best first-class match for Otago was in the 1939–40 Plunket Shield, when he scored 51 and 33 against Auckland. In a low-scoring drawn two-day match in 1944–45, playing for Southland against Otago, Cutler scored 49 and 44; no other Southland batsman exceeded 17. He scored a century for Southland against Otago in 1946–47. 

Cutler umpired 13 first-class matches in Dunedin between 1965 and 1974. He also umpired the second unofficial Test between New Zealand and Australia in 1969–70 at Lancaster Park in Christchurch. He umpired the second List A match in New Zealand, a match of 36 eight-ball overs each between Otago and the touring MCC in February 1971.

See also
 List of Otago representative cricketers

References

External links
 

1913 births
1997 deaths
New Zealand cricketers
Otago cricketers
Cricketers from Palmerston North
New Zealand military personnel of World War II
New Zealand cricket umpires